The 13rd Emmy Awards, later referred to as the 13rd Primetime Emmy Awards, were held on May 16, 1961, to honor the best in television of the year. It was hosted by Joey Bishop and Dick Powell. All nominations are listed, with winners in bold and series' networks are in parentheses.

The top show of the night was the NBC anthology Hallmark Hall of Fame for their production of Macbeth. It won in all its nominated categories, tying the record (since broken) of five major wins. A milestone was set by The Flintstones, it became the first ever animated show to be nominated in one of the main series categories (comedy or drama). It would be the only animated show to accomplish this feat until 2009, when Family Guy was included in the expanded comedy field.

Winners and nominees 

Winners and nominees are listed below.

Programs

Acting

Lead performances

Supporting performances

Single performances

Directing

Writing

Most major nominations
By network 
 CBS – 29
 NBC – 24
 ABC – 9

 By program
 Hallmark Hall of Fame (NBC) – 5
 NBC Sunday Showcase (NBC) – 4
 Hennesey (CBS) / The Untouchables (NBC) – 3

Most major awards
By network 
 CBS / NBC – 8
 ABC – 1

 By program
 Hallmark Hall of Fame (NBC) – 5

Notes

References

External links
 Emmys.com list of 1961 Nominees & Winners
 

013
Emmy Awards
Primetime Emmy Awards
Primetime Emmy
Primetime Emmy Awards